Joshua van Heerden (born 26 June 1998) is a South African cricketer. He made his Twenty20 debut for Eastern Province in the 2018 Africa T20 Cup on 14 September 2018. He made his first-class debut for Eastern Province in the 2018–19 CSA 3-Day Provincial Cup on 11 October 2018. He made his List A debut for Eastern Province in the 2018–19 CSA Provincial One-Day Challenge on 13 January 2019. In September 2019, he was named in Eastern Province's squad for the 2019–20 CSA Provincial T20 Cup. In April 2021, he was named in Border's squad, ahead of the 2021–22 cricket season in South Africa.

In October 2022, he was named in Germany's Twenty20 International (T20I) squad for the 2022–23 Spain Tri-Nation Series. He made his T20I debut for Germany against Italy on 4 November 2022.

References

External links
 

1998 births
Living people
South African cricketers
German cricketers
Germany Twenty20 International cricketers
Eastern Province cricketers
Place of birth missing (living people)